Cirilo Vázquez Lagunes (died November 19, 2006), nicknamed "Cacique of the South," ("cacique del sur" in Spanish) was a Mexican cattle rancher and businessman who had political power in areas in the state of Veracruz. Vázquez died at the hands of assassins at the age of 51.

Dudley Althaus of the Houston Chronicle said that Cirilo Vázquez was "arguably the most powerful political figure in the southern coastal lowlands of Veracruz state." Vázquez, a cacique (a local baron), loaned money and built infrastructure for the areas he lived in. Vázquez never ran for office and was never elected to any government position.

Vázquez had a wife, Deisi Valencia, who served as the mayor of San Juan Evangelista. Vázquez had two daughters, including Fabiola Vázquez Saút, the former mayor of Acayucan, and Regina Vázquez Saút, a former federal congressperson.

Vázquez also had an older brother, Ponciano Vázquez Lagunes; in June 2006, several kidnappers kidnapped Ponciano, demanded the equivalent of two million U.S. dollars in return for Ponciano's release, and killed Ponciano. Despite the act, Vázquez refused to take extra security measures.

Due to a reputation for violence and because of his ambition and shrewd nature, he became well known in the early 1980s. In the 1980s, Vázquez engineered elections of Fabiola and his wife to their respective mayoral positions; he also had Regina elected to Mexico's National Congress.

Authorities imprisoned Vázquez on three occasions for weapons possession, drug trafficking, and murder. Authorities never convicted Vázquez. Friends and family members of Vázquez said that the imprisonments were motivated by politics.

As of 2006 some residents of the Veracruz area sing at least one half-dozen corridos (folk ballads) about Vázquez. One of the corridos depicts a shootout with federal police in the 1980s that left Vázquez's four companions dead and Vázquez in prison.

On November 19, 2006, several assassins ambushed Vázquez as he returned from a semi-pro baseball game in which his team had defeated a regional rival with a 10-1 win. The men shot Vázquez at least twelve times, including three times in the head. Three municipal police officers, who served as Vázquez's bodyguards, and the father of Vázquez's common law wife also died.

References

External links

 (Archive). Diario Olmeca. Tuesday November 21, 2006. 
 Vázquez Chagoya, César Augusto.  (Archivo). Diario Veracruz. Domingo 22 de enero 2006.
 Reyes, Rudolfo. "Asesinan en Veracruz a Cirilo Vázquez, el Cacique del Sur, y a otras cuatro personas" (Archivo). La Crónica de Hoy.
 Cirilo Vázquez Lagunes discute con Hernán Bermúdez Requena

People from Veracruz
Mexican murder victims
People murdered in Mexico
2006 deaths
Year of birth missing